Geophilus okolonae is a species of soil centipede in the family Geophilidae found in Okolona, Arkansas. It grows up to 40 millimeters long and has 61-63 leg pairs. G. okolonae differs from other North American species by the exposed prebasal plates and absence of coxal pores.

Taxonomy
G. okolonae was considered a junior synonym of Geophilus rubens (which is itself synonymous with Geophilus vittatus) by Chamberlin and a junior synonym of G. vittatus by Kevan, but it differs from both these species according to the original description.

References 

okolonae
Taxa named by Charles Harvey Bollman
Arthropods of North America
Animals described in 1888